{
  "type": "ExternalData",
  "service": "page",
  "title": "West and East Jersey Dividing Lines.map"
}

The Keith line was a line drawn through the Province of New Jersey, dividing it into the Province of West Jersey and the Province of East Jersey. The line was created by Surveyor-General George Keith in 1686, when he ran the first survey to mark out the border between West Jersey and East Jersey. The Keith line was intended to clarify disputes resulting from the 1676 Quintipartite Deed, which created the two territories.

The Keith Line runs north-northwest from the southern part of Little Egg Harbor Township, passing just north of Tuckerton. The line was to continue upward to a point on the Delaware River which is just north of the Delaware Water Gap, but Keith was stopped in his survey by Governor of West Jersey Daniel Coxe, when Keith had reached the South Branch of the Raritan River in what is now Three Bridges in Readington Township.  To finish the border, Coxe and his East Jersey counterpart, Governor Robert Barclay met in London to set a compromise boundary called the Coxe-Barclay Line. More accurate surveys and maps were made to further resolve property disputes. This resulted in the Thornton Line, drawn around 1696, and the Lawrence Line, drawn around 1743, which was adopted as the final line for legal purposes.

Today the Keith Line is still visible and can be seen via a map of New Jersey's  municipalities.

In contemporary culture, the Keith Line has been cited as marking the approximate boundary between spheres of influence for New York City sports teams and Philadelphia sports teams; especially in the rivalry between the New York Giants and the Philadelphia Eagles.

References

Pre-statehood history of New Jersey
History of the Thirteen Colonies
Borders of New Jersey
Eponymous border lines